Chombhut is a village in Parner taluka in Ahmednagar district of state of Maharashtra, India.

Religion
The majority of the population in the village is Hindu.

Notable people
The first journalist from the village is Pandurang Mhaske, who worked for Sakal, Mumbai Mirror (Times of India) as an assistant editor. Currently working as a bureau chief, Mumbai of Sakal Times (Sakal Papers Limited, Pune).

Economy
The majority of the population has farming as their primary occupation.

See also
 Parner taluka
 Villages in Parner taluka

References 

Villages in Parner taluka
Villages in Ahmednagar district